HMS TB 9 (originally named HMS Grasshopper) was a Cricket-class coastal destroyer or torpedo-boat of the British Royal Navy. TB 9 was built by the shipbuilder Thornycroft from 1905 to 1907. She was used for local patrol duties in the First World War and was sunk following a collision in the North Sea on 26 July 1916.

Design
The Cricket-class was intended as a smaller and cheaper supplement to the large, fast but expensive Tribal-class, particularly in coastal waters such as the English Channel. An initial order for twelve ships was placed by the Admiralty in May 1905 as part of the 1905–1906 shipbuilding programme, with five ships each ordered from Thornycroft and J. Samuel White and two from Yarrow.

The ships had turtleback forecastles and two funnels. Two oil-fuelled Yarrow water-tube boilers fed steam to three-stage Parsons steam turbines, driving three propeller shafts. The machinery was designed to give , with a speed of  specified.

Armament consisted of two 12-pounder (76-mm) 12 cwt guns, and three 18-inch (450 mm) torpedo tubes (in three single mounts). The ships had a crew of 39.

Service
The fourth of the five torpedo-boats built by Thornycroft under the 1905–1906 programme was laid down as HMS Grasshopper at their Chiswick, London shipyard on 1 November 1905.  In 1906, the ships of the class, including Grasshopper , were redesignated as torpedo-boats, losing their names in the process, with Grasshopper becoming TB 9. She was launched on 18 March 1907, as the last torpedo-craft launched at Thornycroft's Chiswick yard before the company moved to their new shipyard at Woolston, Southampton. She was completed in June 1907.

TB 9 had her turbines rebladed at Chatham dockyard in the summer of 1908. She rejoined the Nore Flotilla after completing a refit early in 1910.

On 23 November 1914, the German submarine U-21 stopped and sunk the merchant ship Malachite on the approaches to Le Havre. Traffic between Southampton and Le Havre was stopped, with French destroyers and torpedo boats carrying out a sweep of the area with the hope of driving the submarine away. As there were six transports stuck in Southampton, needing to get to France, it was decided to provide a strong escort for the transports. On the morning of 24 November 1914, TB 9 and the destroyer , both part of the Portsmouth local defence flotilla, escorted one of the transports, with the remaining five ships being escorted by destroyers sent from Harwich.

On 26 July 1916 TB 9 was sunk in a collision in the North Sea with the destroyer  (which was returning to Harwich after a collision with the destroyer ).

References

Torpedo boats of the Royal Navy
Ships built in Chiswick
1907 ships